The Cathedral Church of St Peter and St Wilfrid, commonly known as Ripon Cathedral, and until 1836 known as Ripon Minster, is  a cathedral in Ripon, North Yorkshire, England. Founded as a monastery by monks of the Irish tradition in the 660s, it was refounded as a Benedictine monastery by St Wilfrid in 672. The church became collegiate in the tenth century, and acted as a mother church within the large Diocese of York for the remainder of the Middle Ages. The present church is the fourth, and was built between the 13th and 16th centuries. In 1836 the church became the cathedral for the Diocese of Ripon. In 2014 the Diocese was incorporated into the new Diocese of Leeds, and the church became one of three co-equal cathedrals of the Bishop of Leeds.

The cathedral is notable architecturally for its gothic west front in the Early English style, considered one of the best of its type, as well as the Geometric east window. The seventh-century crypt of Wilfrid's church is a significant example of early Christian architecture in England. The cathedral has Grade I listed building status.

Background
There has been a stone church on the site since 672 when Saint Wilfrid replaced the previous timber church of the monastery at Ripon (a daughter house of Saint Aidan's monastery at Melrose) with one in the Roman style. This is one of the earliest stone buildings erected in the Anglo-Saxon Kingdom of Northumbria. The crypt dates from this period.

People have been going to worship and pray at Ripon for more than 1,300 years. The cathedral building is part of this continuing act of worship, begun in the 7th century when Saint Wilfrid built one of England's first stone churches on this site, and still renewed every day. Within the nave and choir, you can see the evidence of 800 years in which master craftsmen have expressed their faith in wood and stone.

History

Today's church is the fourth to have stood on this site. Saint Wilfrid brought stonemasons, plasterers and glaziers from France and Italy to build his great basilica in AD 672. A contemporary account by Eddius Stephanus tells us:

Saint Wilfrid was buried in this church near the high altar. Devastated by the English king Eadred in AD 948 as a warning to the Archbishop of York, only the crypt of Wilfrid's church survived but today this tiny 7th-century chapel rests complete beneath the later grandeur of Archbishop Roger de Pont l’Evêque's 12th century minster. A second minster soon arose at Ripon, but it too perished – this time in 1069 at the hands of William the Conqueror. Thomas of Bayeux, first Norman Archbishop of York, then instigated the construction of a third church, traces of which were incorporated into the later chapter house of Roger's minster.

The Early English west front was added in 1220, its twin towers originally crowned with wooden spires and lead. The east window was built as part of a reconstruction of the choir between 1286-8 and 1330, and was described by architecture critic Pevsner as a 'splendid' example of the series of large Decorated gothic windows constructed in Northern England. Major rebuilding had to be postponed due to the outbreak of the Wars of the Roses but resumed after the accession of Henry VII and the restoration of peace in 1485. The crossing tower was rebuilt after it collapsed in an earthquake in 1450 but was never completed. Between 1501 and 1522 the nave walls were raised higher and the aisles added. The church's thirty-four misericords were carved between 1489 and 1494. The same (Ripon) school of carvers also carved the misericords at Beverley Minster and Manchester Cathedral. But in 1547, before this work was finished, Edward VI dissolved Ripon's college of canons. All revenues were appropriated by the Crown and the tower never received its last perpendicular arches. It was not until 1604 that James I issued his Charter of Restoration.

During the civil war, much of the stained glass was smashed and some of the statues were destroyed.

Cathedral status
The minster finally became a cathedral (the church where the Bishop has his cathedra or throne) in 1836, the focal point of the newly created Anglican Diocese of Ripon – the first to be established since the Reformation.

Dean and chapter
As of 30 December 2020:
Dean – John Dobson (since 14 June 2014 installation)
Canon Precentor – Michael Gisbourne (since 16 September 2018 installation)
Canon Educator (i.e. Canon Chancellor) – Barry Pyke (since 11 September 2016 installation; previously called "Canon for Rural Engagement and Education")
Canon Pastor – Ailsa Newby (since June 2017; Newby is also The Lady Newby by her marriage to Dick Newby)

Music
The current director of music is Dr Ronny Krippner, with Tim Harper as assistant director of music.

Organ

The cathedral has a fine organ by Harrison and Harrison, which is a rebuild of the original Lewis instrument dating from 1878. The organ is on the screen and has casework by Gilbert Scott. A specification of the organ can be found on the National Pipe Organ Register. The organ last underwent a major refurbishment in 2013. These works included a thorough cleaning and repair of all pipe work.

Organists

In 1447, the organ at Ripon Cathedral was played by a priest, Thomas Litster. Notable organists have included composers Charles Harry Moody and Ronald Edward Perrin.

Bells

A ring of 12 bells with an additional 'flat sixth' bell is hung in the south-west tower. A diatonic ring of ten bells was cast in 1932, and three additional bells were installed in 2008 with two new trebles being added to give a diatonic ring of twelve, and an additional 'flat sixth' bell to give a light ring of eight.

Gallery

See also
Ripon
 Architecture of the medieval cathedrals of England
 English Gothic architecture
 Romanesque architecture
 Church of England
 Diocese of Leeds
 Dean and Chapter of Ripon
List of Gothic Cathedrals in Europe

References

Sources

Further reading

External links

Ripon Cathedral Website
Ripon Cathedral on Skyscrapernews.com
Ripon Cathedral Library and the Dean and Chapter Archive; University of Leeds
A history of the choristers of Ripon Cathedral
MUSIC AT RIPON CATHEDRAL 657–2008

7th-century church buildings in England
Churches completed in 1574
Ripon
Anglican cathedrals in England
Gothic architecture in England
Ripon
Anglican Diocese of Leeds
Church of England church buildings in North Yorkshire
Monasteries in North Yorkshire
Anglo-Catholic church buildings in North Yorkshire
Tourist attractions in North Yorkshire
Churches with elements of Anglo-Saxon work
English Gothic architecture in North Yorkshire
Anglo-Saxon cathedrals
Grade I listed buildings in Ripon
Grade I listed churches in North Yorkshire
Grade I listed cathedrals
Edward Blore buildings
7th-century establishments in England
Diocese of Ripon
Churches completed in 672